Årsunda is a locality situated in Sandviken Municipality, Gävleborg County, Sweden with 1,008 inhabitants in 2010.

Sports
The following sports clubs are located in Årsunda:

 Årsunda IF

References 

Populated places in Sandviken Municipality
Gästrikland